Ikhwan Azka Fauzi Wibowo (born 4 February 1996), commonly known as Azka Fauzi, is an Indonesian professional footballer who plays for Persikab Bandung. Mainly a forward, he can also play as a winger on both flanks.

Club career

Bali United
Fauzi made his professional debut in a 2–1 home loss to Persipura Jayapura. He replaced Irfan Bachdim after 74 minutes.

References

External links
 Azka Fauzi at Soccerway
 Azka Fauzi at Liga Indonesia

1996 births
Living people
Indonesian footballers
Association football midfielders
Bali United F.C. players
Liga 1 (Indonesia) players
Sportspeople from Bandung